Hikawa (written: 氷川) is a Japanese surname. Notable people with the surname include:

, Japanese manga artist
, Japanese enka singer
, Japanese anime critic and writer

Japanese-language surnames